Beit Herut (lit. House of Freedom) is a moshav in central Israel. Located in the Sharon plain between Hadera and Netanya, it falls under the jurisdiction of Hefer Valley Regional Council.

History
The moshav was founded in 1933 by immigrants from the United States, and was initially named Herut America Bet, as the moshav now known as Herut was named Herut America Alef at the time (there was also a Herut America Gimel, which is today called Hadar Am). The name was taken from the organisation which helped the residents immigrate to Mandate Palestine.

References

External links

American-Jewish culture in Israel
Moshavim
Populated places established in 1933
Populated places in Central District (Israel)
1933 establishments in Mandatory Palestine